Peene may refer to:

 Peene, a river in Germany
 Peene Becque, a river in France
 Peene, Kent, a village in England
 Hippoliet van Peene (1811–1864), a Flemish physician and playwright

See also
Peen (disambiguation)